Roberto Garza (born March 26, 1979) is a former American football center. He was drafted by the Atlanta Falcons in the fourth round (99th overall) of the 2001 NFL Draft, and in 2005, joined the Chicago Bears, spending ten seasons with the team. Despite being an offensive lineman, a position not typically glorified in American football, Garza was a fan favorite among Hispanic Americans across the United States.

High school years
Garza attended Rio Hondo High School in Rio Hondo, Texas and was a letterman in football and track and field.  He was also a member of the school's National Honor Society.

Post-high school
The son of Roberto Garza Sr., and Ofelia Garza from Mexico, Garza was encouraged to join the Marines after high school.  A Marine recruiter interested in Garza ridiculed his desire to play professional football, allegedly stating that "Mexicans do not play in the NFL".  Roberto was not discouraged. He kept on working. He ended up playing for the Texas A&M University-Kingsville Javelinas as a "walk-on".  In addition to playing football, Roberto worked to pay for school.  Garza's hometown of Rio Hondo, Texas established December 2 as "Roberto Garza, Jr. Day", and subsequently named a street after him. He is fluent in Spanish.

Professional career
He was originally selected by the Atlanta Falcons with the 99th overall pick of 2001 NFL Draft from Texas A&M University-Kingsville. Garza played with the Falcons up until the 2004 season when his contract was up. He signed a one-year contract with the Chicago Bears in 2005, after also visiting the Baltimore Ravens, and he signed a six-year contract extension in 2006. In that season, the Bears reached a 39–14 victory over the New Orleans Saints, which allowed them to claim the NFC Championship and advance to Super Bowl XLI. However, they fell short of the championship, losing 29–17 to the Indianapolis Colts. Among the almost 1,700 National Football League players in the 2006 season, Garza was one of only 19 Hispanics. Garza became a free agent after the 2013 season, but was resigned to a 1-year contract on February 27, 2014.

On April 2, 2015, Garza was released by the Bears, ending a ten-year tenure.

In the media
He was chosen to be the cover athlete of the Spanish version of Madden 09 En Español.

In 2012, Garza, along with teammate and defensive end Henry Melton were named to the USA Today 2012 All-Joe Team.

He also served as sideline reporter for Fox Deportes' broadcast of Super Bowl XLVIII. Garza later served as a commentator for ESPN Deportes' broadcast of Super Bowl 50.

He was also featured in a Modelo Beer commercial alongside fellow former Hispanic football players Tony Gonzalez and Anthony Muñoz.

Charitable work
Garza is a supporter and member of the United Way, a group of charitable organizations dedicated to helping less fortunate children and the elderly. In 2006, Garza was named the Chicago Bears' nominee for the Walter Payton Man of the Year Award.  He has previously worked with the Empty Stocking Fund, the Atlanta Falcons' Feed The Homeless Campaign, and the Hall County Boys & Girls Club. He also supports Big Brothers Big Sisters of Metropolitan Chicago.

References

External links
 Official website
 Official Chicago Bears bio

1979 births
Living people
People from Cameron County, Texas
Atlanta Falcons players
Chicago Bears players
Texas A&M–Kingsville Javelinas football players
American football offensive guards
American football centers
American sportspeople of Mexican descent
Players of American football from Texas
Ed Block Courage Award recipients